Petra was an ancient settlement in Illyricum. Julius Caesar writes that it was situated upon a hill upon the coast, which had only a moderately good harbour. Its site is tentatively located near modern Shkëmbi i Kavajës.

See also 
List of settlements in Illyria

References 

Cities in ancient Illyria
Populated places in Illyria
Former populated places in the Balkans
Illyrian Albania